Giovanni or Gian Battista Sommariva (died 6 January 1826, Milan) was an Italian politician of the Cisalpine Republic and a notable arts patron.

Born in Milan, he practiced as a lawyer in Lombardy when he was recruited to become secretary general of the directory of the Cisalpine Republic.  In 1799, he fled from Milan to France to escape the armies of Suvorov, but returned after the Battle of Marengo. His notable collection of Neoclassical art is exhibited at the Villa Carlotta in Tremezzo.

References

Bibliography
 Gabriella Tassinari - Incisori in pietre dure e collezionisti a Milano nel primo ottocento: il caso di Antonio Berini e Giovanni Battista Sommariva  - Le gemme incise nel settecento e ottocento - Continuità della tradizione classica. (Atti del Convegno di studio, Udine, 26 settembre 1998). Editore L'Erma di Bretschneider 2006
P.E. Visconti - Notizia delle opera dell'incisore in pietre dure e in coni Cav. Giuseppe Girometti - Roma tipografia Boulzaler 1833  Dedicato alla Eminenza Reverendissima del Sig. cardinale Mario Mattei
Patrick Kragelund, Bertel Thorvaldsen, Mogens Nykjær Thorvaldsen: l'ambiente, l'influsso, il mito edito da L'Erma di Bretschneider 1991 pag.96

1826 deaths
Italian philanthropists
Italian politicians
18th-century Italian politicians
19th-century Italian politicians
Politicians of Lombardy